Lev Nikolaevich Gassovsky (1894 – 1989) was a Soviet professor (1935), Candidate of Science (1938), and Doctor of Physical and Mathematical Sciences (1940). He wrote The Eye and Effectiveness of Its Work and also worked on chapters in reference books for opto-mechanical engineers, several manuals on military optics and more than 90 scientific works.

Biography 
In 1918, Gassovsky graduated from the Leningrad (Petrograd) State University before graduating in 1927 from the German Higher School of Optics in Jena. He worked as a physics teacher at the Leningrad Labor School (1918–1919) and the Military Engineering Academy (1922–25). He also was an assistant at the Pedagogical Institute (1919-1923), an associate professor at the Mining Institute (1921-1923), an associate professor at the Electro-Mechanical Institute (1930-1932), and a consultant at the Union Association of Opto-Mechanical Industry (1934-1936). Gassovsky worked at the Leningrad Institute of Precision Mechanics and Optics (LIPMO) as an associate professor and the Head of the Laboratory Devices and Microscopes Department (1930-1941). He was the dean of the evening institute within LIPMO (1932-1933). Gassovsky also became the founder and head of the Physiological Optics and Eyewear (1934). From 1936 to 1941, Gassovsky held a position as the executive editor of the journal “The works of the Leningrad Institute of Precision Mechanics and Optics”. – Moscow-Leningrad: Department of Scientific and Technical Information, People's Commissariat of the Tank Industry of the USSR, the Chief Editorial board of literature on engineering and metal working, the General Board of institutions. Gassovsky made significant contributions in the development of Soviet ophthalmic and physiological optics. He was awarded with the Order of Lenin (1953), the Order of Honor (1943) and other USSR medals.

References
Виртуальный музей Университет ИТМО

Soviet engineers
1894 births
1989 deaths
Academic staff of ITMO University